Sparsentan, sold under the brand name Filspari, is a medication used for the treatment of primary immunoglobulin A nephropathy. Sparsentan is an endothelin and angiotensin II receptor antagonist.

It was approved for medical use in the United States in February 2023.

Medical uses 
Sparsentan is indicated to reduce proteinuria in people with primary immunoglobulin A nephropathy.

Society and culture

Legal status 
Sparsentan is approved in the US under accelerated approval based on reduction of proteinuria.

References

External links 
 

Orphan drugs